JS Hamagiri (DD-155) is an  of the Japan Maritime Self-Defense Force.

Development and design 
The Asagiri class is equipped for combat and interception missions, and is primarily armed with anti-ship weapons. They carry two Mk-141 Guided Missile Launching System (GMLS), which are anti-ship missile systems. The ship is also fitted to be used against submarines. They also carries the Mk-32 Surface Vessel Torpedo Tubes (SVTT), which can be used as an anti-submarine weapon. The ship has two of these systems abeam to starboard and to port. They are also fitted with an Oto-Melara 62-caliber gun to be used against sea and air targets.

The ship can have up to 220 personnel on board. The ship is also fitted to accommodate for one aircraft. The ship's flight deck can be used to service a SH-60J9(K) Seahawk helicopter.

Construction and career 
Hamagiri was laid down on 20 January 1987 and launched on 4 June 1988 by Hitachi Zosen Corporation, Maizuru. She was commissioned on 31 January 1990.

The Hamagiri was deployed to Somalia alongside the Takanami to the Gulf of Aden on October 4, 2009 to take over anti-piracy operations from the Harusame and the Amagiri.

The vessel was dispatched to the Great East Japan Earthquake caused by the 2011 off the Pacific coast of Tōhoku Earthquake on 11 March 2011.

On 7 April 2013, as the 15th dispatched anti-piracy action surface corps, the destroyer sailed off the coast of Somalia with the escort ship , completed the mission, and returned to Ominato on 27 September 2013. On 26 and 28 October 2014, she participated in the Japan-Russia search and rescue joint training conducted in the port of Vladivostok, Russia and off the coast of Vladivostok.

From 20 to 25 November 2017, Hamagiri participated in the Japan-Russia search and rescue joint training conducted at Vladivostok Port and the surrounding waters with the Russian Navy destroyer .

Gallery

References 

Asagiri-class destroyers
Ships built by Hitachi Zosen Corporation
1988 ships